Carnegie station may refer to:

 Carnegie Station, Western Australia, Australia; a pastoral lease
 Carnegie railway station, Melbourne, Victoria, Australia
 Carnegie station (PAAC) (bus station), Carnegie, Pennsylvania, USA

See also
 Carnegie (disambiguation)